The White House Director of Speechwriting is a role within the Executive Office of the President of the United States. The officeholder serves as senior advisor and chief speechwriter to the President of the United States. They are also responsible for managing the Office of Speechwriting within the Office of Communications.

List

References 

Executive Office of the President of the United States

White House
White House Office